Nino Marković (born 9 December 1962) is a former Croatian handball player and current youth coordinator at RK Zagreb.

Career
Marković was born in Zagreb. During his handball career, he played for Medveščak Zagreb, Zamet Rijeka, Zagreb Loto, Sisak, Varteks Tivar and Moslavina Kutina. With Medveščak he won four cup titles.
In 1989 he moved to Zamet where he played for one season before joining Zagreb Chromos the following year named Zagreb Loto. In 1992 Marković won the league, cup and European Champions Cup title with the club.

He later played for RK Sisak, Varteks Tivar Varaždin and Moslavina Kutina. With moslavina he reached the 1996 Croatian Cup final where they were beaten by Croatia Banka Zagreb by two goals.

After retiring as a player he became a coach at RK Zagreb. During his coaching career he has mostly coached youth selections of RK Zagreb winning various domestic championships and tournaments. From 2001 to 2003 Marković was head coach of the senior team of RK Zagreb alongside Vlado Nekić. Later he was Lino Červars assistant coach at the team.

He was also a coach of Croatia U-19 with who won the IHF Men's Youth World Championship in Tunisia 2009.

Honours

Player
Medveščak Zagreb
Yugoslav Cup (4): 1981, 1986, 1987, 1989

Zagreb Loto
Yugoslav First League (1): 1990-91
Yugoslav Cup (1): 1991
Croatian First A League (1): 1992
Croatian Cup (1): 1992
European Champions Cup (1): 1991-92

Coach
Zagreb
Croatian First A League (2): 2001-02, 2002-03
Croatian Cup (1): 2003

Croatia U-19
IHF Men's Youth World Championship (1): 2009

References

External links
Rk zagreb profile

Yugoslav male handball players
Croatian male handball players
RK Zagreb players
RK Zamet players
RK Zagreb coaches
Handball players from Zagreb
1962 births
Living people
Croatian handball coaches